Guido Basile (16 July 1893, Messina - 1 December 1984) was an Italian politician. He represented the Labour Democratic Party in the Constituent Assembly of Italy  and the Italian Liberal Party in the Chamber of Deputies from 1953 to 1968.

References

1893 births
1984 deaths
Politicians from Messina
Labour Democratic Party politicians
Italian Liberal Party politicians
Members of the Constituent Assembly of Italy
Deputies of Legislature II of Italy
Deputies of Legislature III of Italy
Deputies of Legislature IV of Italy